The Champlain Canal is a  canal in New York that connects the Hudson River to the south end of Lake Champlain. It was simultaneously constructed with the Erie Canal for use by commercial vessels, fully opening in 1823. Today, it is mostly used by recreational boaters as part of the New York State Canal System and Lakes to Locks Passage.

History
An early proposal made in the 1790s by Marc Isambard Brunel for a Hudson River–Lake Champlain canal was not approved. Another proposal for the canal was made in 1812 and construction authorized in 1817. By 1818,  were completed, and in 1819 the canal was opened from Fort Edward to Lake Champlain. The canal was officially opened on September 10, 1823. It was an immediate financial success, and carried substantial commercial traffic until the 1970s.

In 1903, New York authorized the expansion of the Champlain Canal—along with the Erie, Oswego, and Cayuga–Seneca Canals—into the "New York State Barge Canal." The project broke ground in 1905 and was completed in 1918. The "Barge Canal" name fell out of use in 1992.

The abandoned Lake Champlain Seaway proposal would have upgraded the Champlain Canal into a ship canal, easing marine transport between New York City and Montreal.

Route

By traveling the length of Lake Champlain, boaters can access the Richelieu River and Chambly Canal, which connect Lake Champlain to the Saint Lawrence River.

Locks 

The following list of locks is provided for the current canal, from south to north. There are a total of 11 locks on the Champlain Canal.

Overall sidewall height will vary by lock, ranging between  depending on the lift and navigable stages.

There is no Lock C10 on the Champlain Canal. The Troy Federal Lock, located just north of Troy, New York, is not part of the New York State Canal System proper; it is operated by the United States Army Corps of Engineers. The Champlain Canal officially begins at the confluence of the Hudson and Mohawk rivers at Waterford, New York.

Distance is based on position markers from an interactive canal map provided online by the New York State Canal Corporation and may not exactly match specifications on signs posted along the canal. Mean surface elevations are comprised from a combination of older canal profiles and history books as well as specifications on signs posted along the canal. The margin of error should normally be within .

All surface elevations are approximate.

* Denotes Federal managed locks.

References

External links

Information and Boater's Guide to the New York State Canal System
History of the Canal System of the State of New York—Champlain Canal
New York State Canals—Map of the Champlain Canal
Champlain Canal Net—History and Photographs
Historic Glens Falls Feeder Canal

 (replaced)

Canals on the National Register of Historic Places in New York (state)
Canals in New York (state)
Historic American Buildings Survey in New York (state)
Historic American Engineering Record in New York (state)
Historic districts on the National Register of Historic Places in New York (state)
Bridges in Rensselaer County, New York
Transportation buildings and structures in Saratoga County, New York
Transportation buildings and structures in Washington County, New York
Tributaries of the Hudson River
Canals opened in 1823
National Register of Historic Places in Rensselaer County, New York
National Register of Historic Places in Saratoga County, New York
National Register of Historic Places in Washington County, New York
1823 establishments in New York (state)